The Blackwood Covered Bridge, over the Shade River near Athens, Ohio, was built in 1881.  It is a King post truss bridge.  It was listed on the National Register of Historic Places in 1978.

It is a single-span bridge with "vertical, high-boarded siding, a metal roof, projected portals, and cut-stone abutments."  It is named for the Blackwood family which owned much of Lodi township.

References

External links

Covered bridges in Ohio
National Register of Historic Places in Athens County, Ohio
Infrastructure completed in 1881